The following is a list of episodes for the English-language French animated television series A.T.O.M.

A number of episodes were aired out of order for unknown reasons. This results in some chronological mistakes, such as Axel mentioning meeting Paine's daughter in episode 4, when the encounter does not take place until episode 10.

Series overview

Episodes

Season 1 (2005–06)

Season 2 (2006–07)

References

External links
 

A.T.O.M.